Hickville to Broadway is a 1921 American silent comedy film directed by Carl Harbaugh and starring Eileen Percy, William Scott and Rosemary Theby.

Cast
 Eileen Percy as 	Anna Mae Neil
 William Scott as 	Virgil Cole
 Rosemary Theby as Sibyle Fane
 J.P. Lockney as Elder Neil 
 Margaret Morris as Violet Garden
 Ray Howard as Pinky Hale
 Paul Kamp as Helper
 Edmund Burns as Peter Van Reuter

References

Bibliography
 Munden, Kenneth White. The American Film Institute Catalog of Motion Pictures Produced in the United States, Part 1. University of California Press, 1997.

External links
 

1921 films
1921 comedy films
1920s English-language films
American silent feature films
Silent American comedy films
Films directed by Carl Harbaugh
American black-and-white films
Fox Film films
1920s American films